WQKX (94.1 FM, "94KX") is a commercial FM radio station licensed to serve Sunbury, Pennsylvania. The station is owned by Sunbury Broadcasting Corporation and broadcasts a Top 40 format. Its broadcast tower is located near Trevorton.

History
The Federal Communications Commission granted Sunbury Broadcasting Corporation a construction permit for the station on September 14, 1945 with the WKOK-FM call sign. Originally assigned to 100.3 MHz, the FCC reassigned the station to 99.3 MHz on November 11, 1945 followed by another reassignment to 94.1 MHz on June 27, 1947.

The station signed on for the first time in 1948. The FCC granted the station its first license on February 17, 1949. Until 1975, the station simulcast the programming of WKOK (AM). In 1978, the call sign was changed to WQKX.

Signal Note

References

External links
 
 
 
 

QKX
Contemporary hit radio stations in the United States